Rocketry may refer to:

Science and technology
 The design and construction of rockets
 The hobbyist or (semi-)professional use of model rockets
 Aerospace engineering, also known as rocket science 
 Amateur rocketry, a hobby in which participants experiment with fuels or custom rocket motors
 High-power rocketry, a hobby similar to model rocketry that includes high-powered rockets

Other uses
Rocketry: The Nambi Effect (2022), an Indian biographical film on the life of Nambi Narayanan directed by R. Madhavan